The Ploiești Philharmonic Orchestra is a Romanian orchestra based in Ploiești, Prahova County. The orchestra's home is the Paul Constantinescu Philharmonic, located in centre of Ploiești.

History
The orchestra was founded in 1952, making an inaugural concert on the 18th of December. This orchestra was named after a well known composer, Paul Constantinescu and with the help of various other conductors as Ion Baciu, George Petrescu, Eugen Pricope, Corneliu Dumbrăveanu, Alexandru Sumschi, Horia Andreescu, Cristian Brancuși, Emanuel Elenescu, Paul Popescu, Ovidiu Balan, Romeo Rambu, Ilarion Ionescu Galați, Radu Postavaru, they managed to establish this cultural centre in Ploiești.

Ploiești Philharmonic Orchestra today

Some of the names that had concerts in this hall: Igor Bezrodnii, Carlo Farina, Paavo Berglund, Renard Czajkovski, Michael Heize, Franco de Masi, Enzo Ferraris, Lee Sun Young, Maximino Zumalave, Daniil Safran, Li Ming Cean, Silvia Mercier, Viktor Eresko, Pavel Kogan, Ion Voicu, Stefan Ruha, Mihaela Martin, Lenuta Ciulei-Atanasiu, Gabriel Groitoru, Florin Croitoru, Valentin Gheorghiu, Dan Grigore, Mihaela Ursuleasa, Josu De Solaun Soto, and Marin Cazacu.

The concert Hall "Ion Baciu" is named after the great conductor Ion Baciu, which was the first real leap, which gave specific color printed accents orchestra and the personality. Ion Baciu held in Ploiesti, a prodigious activity: first auditions, musical internships for students in the county and national tournaments, demanding in choosing and shaping their musicians, involvement in community activities, which wrote some of its pages significant attachment to some local initiatives, which has struggled to transform the cultural facts.
The orchestra became well known internationally especially for the Violin Competition "Rodolfo Lipizer" from Gorizia (Italy), where for 18 years he was the orchestra that accompanied the finalists of this prestigious competition.  The Ploiesti State Philharmonic Orchestra made concert tours in Germany, Luxembourg, Canada, Italy, France, South Korea, Holland, Belgium, Greece, Spain, Czech and other countries.
The Ploiesti Philharmonic "Paul Cosntantinescu" held prestigious competitions as "Gala for Young Conductors", "Lory Walfish Piano Competition", "Eugenia Moldoveanu Vocal Contest", "Paul Constantinescu Competition", and was invited in the 2011-2012 editions into Contemporary Music Festival (SIMN) organized by Composers and Musicologists Union of Romania (UCMR).
Ploiesti Philharmonic Orchestra has various repertories from classic music to modern and in its programs being found very often Romanian creations of modern and contemporary music. Works of composers like Tiberiu Olah, Anatol Vieru, Ştefan Niculescu, Dan Dediu, Viorel Munteanu, Sabin Pautza, Dan Buciu, Vasile Spătărelu, Irina Odăgescu-Țuțuianu, Carmen Petra-Basacopol, Grigore Cudalbu and many others, was interpreted, some in first audition, in the Ploiesti Philharmonic Hall.
George Enescu's creations is in repertoire of  Ploiesti Philharmonic Orchestra where he played both nationally and internationally with a deep respect for the great Romanian composer.

Music Directors and other artistic leaders

External links
 Official site

Musical groups established in 1952
Romanian orchestras
Ploiești
1952 establishments in Romania